Saros cycle series 133 for solar eclipses occurs at the Moon's ascending node, repeating every 18 years, 11 days, containing 72 events. All eclipses in this series occurs at the Moon's ascending node.

Solar Saros 133 is one of the saros series of solar eclipse cycles. The final eclipse in the series will be on September 5, 2499. All eclipses in this series occurs at the Moon's ascending node.

The period separating each of the 72 eclipses in the series is approximately 6585.3 days (18 years, 11 days); that period was first called a saros by astronomer Edmond Halley. This solar saros is linked to Lunar Saros 126.

20th and 21st century
Five of the series of solar eclipses occur during the 21st century: November 13, 2012,  November 25, 2030, December 5, 2048,  December 17, 2066, and December 27, 2084.

Umbral eclipses
Umbral eclipses (annular, total and hybrid) can be further classified as either: 1) Central (two limits), 2) Central (one limit) or 3) Non-Central (one limit). The statistical distribution of these classes in Saros series 133 appears in the following table.

List
In the following list, the Julian calendar is used for the first 21 members of the series; the Gregorian calendar is used for all the rest,
starting with the solar eclipse of March 7, 1598.

References

External links
Saros cycle 133 - Information and visualization

Solar saros series
1219 establishments
25th century